Stellar density is the average number of stars within a unit volume. It is similar to the stellar mass density, which is the total solar masses (MSun) found within a unit volume. Typically, the volume used by astronomers to describe the stellar density is a cubic parsec (pc3).

In the solar neighborhood, this value can be determined from surveys of nearby stars, combined with estimates of the number of faint stars that may have been missed. The density estimate varies across space, with the density decreasing rapidly in the direction out of the galactic plane.

The locations within the Milky Way that have the highest stellar density are the central core and the interior of globular clusters.

References

Stellar astronomy